Thomas Mossie McQuater (4 September 1914 – 20 January 2008) was a Scottish jazz trumpeter.

Biography
Born in Maybole, Ayrshire, McQuater was most notable for his work in the United Kingdom with Bert Ambrose in the 1930s, and also for some recordings made with George Chisholm and Benny Carter. McQuater showed musical talent from an early age. Largely self-taught, he began on the cornet and by the age of 11 was a regular member of the Maybole Burgh Band – a brass band that won several competitions in the late 1920s – and played at local events and dances.

McQuater turned professional in his teens and got a regular position with Louis Freeman's Band, which played at Greens Playhouse in Glasgow.

In 1934, aged 20, McQuater was offered a job with one of London's most renowned bands: the Jack Payne Orchestra, which played in London and Paris. The following year he joined Lew Stone's band and made the classic recording of "Pardon Me, Pretty Baby". In the 1940s, McQuater joined The Squadronaires, and worked with the BBC Showband in 1945. McQuater often performed with John McLevy in the 1970s and 1980s. In his later years, he concentrated his energy and playing around the Ealing Jazz Festival.

Death
He died in London, aged 93, and was survived by his two sons.

Select discography
With Johnny Dankworth
Fall Guy (Parlophone)

With George Chisholm
Early Days 1935-1944 (Timeless Holland)

With Bert Ambrose & His Orchestra
When Day Is Done (ASV Records)

With Kenny Baker
Kenny Baker's Dozen Play Not Quite Two Dozen (Jasmine Records)

With Tommy Watt and His Orchestra
Watt's Cooking (Bethlehem Records)

With The Vile Bodies Swing Band
A Nightingale Sang in Berkeley Square (Pickwick Records)

References

External links
International Trumpet Guild obituary

1914 births
2008 deaths
People from South Ayrshire
Musicians from Glasgow
Musicians from London
Scottish jazz trumpeters
Male trumpeters
20th-century trumpeters
20th-century British male musicians
British male jazz musicians
The Squadronaires members